Hélène Pelletier-Baillargeon (born 1932) is a Canadian femme de lettres, journalist, essayist, and biographer from Quebec.

Early life and education
Hélène Pelletier-Baillargeon was born in Montreal in 1932. She is the daughter of Dominique Pelletier, notary (1892-1950). Her uncle, Georges Pelletier (1882-1950), was director of Le Devoir from 1932 to 1947.

After obtaining a Master of Arts degree from the Université de Montréal in 1954, she completed two years of post-graduate studies, from 1957 to 1959, at the Sorbonne and at the School for Advanced Studies in the Social Sciences, and did research at the Bibliothèque nationale de France for a doctorate in literature, with a doctoral thesis in stylistics devoted to the work of François Mauriac.

Career
When she returned to Quebec, she joined the editorial team of the magazine, Maintain, from its founding in 1962. A Dominican magazine administered by lay people from 1969, it came under Pelletier's direction in 1973 and closed in 1974.

She was a freelance journalist from 1974 to 1981, including at Châtelaine as a political and union columnist, at the magazine Critère, as vice-president of the Board of Directors and editor, as well as at Le Devoir, Revue Desjardins, Communauté chrétienne, La Presse, Possibles, and others. From 1981 to 1983, she was a political advisor to the Quebec Minister of Education, Camille Laurin, on the issue of denominational education. She was a weekly columnist for La Presse from 1986 to 1989. She continues to participate in a large number of collective works and cultural, historical and religious periodicals in Quebec and Canada. She participated in many conferences as a guest speaker on education, the status of women, ecclesial life, family or cultural politics.

In addition, she participates in several organizations of social, educational and cultural interest including the Board of Directors of the Montreal Museum of Fine Arts, Conseil supérieur de l'éducation du Québec, Conseil des affaires sociales de l'Assemblée des évêques du Québec, Board of Directors of the Lionel-Groulx Foundation, Board of Directors of Éditions Fides, among others. She is a member of the Union des écrivaines et des écrivains québécois.

Awards and honours
 1985, Finalist, Prix du Gouverneur général
 1985, Prix Maxime-Raymond
 1991, Member, Conseil supérieur de la langue française
 1999, Knight, National Order of Quebec 
 2002, Prix Odyssée
 2011, Prix Rosaire-Morin Prize, awarded by the Ligue d'action nationale (chaired by Denis Monière) (she is the first recipient of this new prize)
 2011, 3rd Prize of the Presidency of the National Assembly for the book Olivar Asselin et son temps, volume 3,  Le maître

Selected works 
 Une nouvelle morale sexuelle, Montréal, Fides, 1976, 
 Contemplation ou Le Carmel De Montréal : ses racines, sa spiritualité, sa vie, Montréal, Éditions Fides, 1977, 
 Le pays légitime, Montréal, Leméac, : Collection « À hauteur d'homme », 1979, 
 Marie Gérin-Lajoie : de mère en fille, la cause des femmes, Montréal, Éditions du Boréal, 1985, 
 Simonne Monet-Chartrand : un héritage et des projets (dir. Hélène Pelletier-Baillargeon), Montréal : Fides, Montréal : Éditions du Remue-ménage, 1993, 
 Olivar Asselin et son temps :
 [volume 1] Le militant, Montréal, Fides, 1996, 
 [volume 2] Le volontaire, Montréal, Fides, 2001, 
 [volume 3] Le maître, Montréal, Fides, 2010, 
 presentation of : Jules Fournier, Mon encrier, Montréal, Bibliothèque québécoise, 1996, 
 in : Vingt années de recherches en éthique et de débats au Québec Montréal, Fides, 1997, 
 Bernard Andrès, Stéphane-Albert Boulais, John Hare, Marcel Olscamp, Hélène Pelletier-Baillargeon, François Ricard, Lucie Robert, Patricia Smart, Robert Vigneault, Approches de la biographie au Québec (dir. Dominique Lafon, Rainier Grutman, Marcel Olscamp et Robert Vigneault), Montréal, Fides, Collection « Archives des lettres canadiennes », 2004, 
 presentation of : Olivar Asselin, L'Œuvre de l'abbé Groulx,, Montréal, Fides, 2007,

References

1932 births
Living people
Journalists from Montreal
Writers from Montreal
Canadian essayists
Canadian biographers
20th-century Canadian journalists
20th-century Canadian women writers
Canadian writers in French